The Patriotic Health Campaign, first started in the 1950s, was a campaign aimed to improve sanitation, hygiene, as well as attack diseases in the People's Republic of China.

See also
Ministry of Health

Notes

External links
"China follows Mao with mass cull" BBC news.
"Critical health literacy: a case study from China in schistosomiasis control"
"Children's Health and Care" in China.

Health in China
Health campaigns